Mezco Toyz is an American company that makes action figures and other collectibles based on original and licensed properties. One of the popular products is the cult hit toy line Living Dead Dolls. The more popular line is its One:12 line, which has licenses to popular brands such as Marvel, DC, and Godzilla. Other popular licensed properties include Family Guy, South Park and Hellboy. Outside of action figures and doll releases, Mezco is also known for their original block-style figures line Mez-Itz.

History 
Mezco Toyz was created by Michael Markowitz (Mez), the President of Mezco, who maintains himself as the driving force behind all aspects of design and development. Working with the best talents in the toy industry, Markowitz conceives and directs each line from start to finish.

Mezco Toyz was established in 2000 from the ashes of the short-lived toy production company Aztech Toyz, which obtained recognition for its stylized line of Silent Screamers action figures based on classic black and white silent pictures from the beginning of cinema. The Silent Screamers line was renewed as one of the original releases from Mezco.

As of March 1st, 2023, the company offered products from over 60 brands.

Products

Original creations
Creepy Cuddlers: Zombies
Living Dead Dolls
LDD presents
Rumble Society
Mez-its
Rumble-Mugz
Gomez
5 points
Mezco Designer Series
Mezco's Monsters

Licensed products 

Cinema Of Fear
ThunderCats
Earthworm Jim
Mars Attacks
Universal Monsters
Child's Play
South Park
Domo
LittleBigPlanet 
Family Guy
Scott Pilgrim
Kaiju Collective

Mezco One:12 Collective 

Marvel Comics
Wolverine
Captain America
Doctor Strange
The Punisher
Spider-Man
Spider-Man (Miles Morales)
Iron Man
Red Skull
Deadpool
Old Man Logan
Daredevil
Cyclops
Blade
Ghost Rider
Black Bolt and Lockjaw
Magneto
Moon Knight
Iron Fist
Gambit
Thanos
Bishop
Marvel Cinematic Universe
Thor: Ragnarok
Spider-Man: Homecoming
Daredevil
Black Panther
The Punisher
Captain Marvel
DC Comics
Batman
Shazam
Darkseid
Green Arrow
Arsenal
Black Adam
The Joker
Deathstroke
The Flash
Reverse Flash
Green Lantern (John Stewart)
Commissioner Gordon
Catwoman
Green Lantern (Hal Jordan)
Aquaman
Harley Quinn
Black Mask
Wonder Woman
KGBeast
John Constantine
Doctor Fate
DC Extended Universe
Batman v Superman: Dawn of Justice
Suicide Squad
Wonder Woman
Justice League
Halloween
Star Trek
James T. Kirk
Spock
Hikaru Sulu
Leonard McCoy
Judge Dredd
Space Ghost
Universal Monsters
Frankenstein
A Clockwork Orange
Ghostbusters
Ray Stantz
Egon Spengler
Peter Venkman
Winston Zeddmore
Evil Dead II
Diabolik
Popeye
John Wick 2
The Warriors
Batman (1989 film)
Conan the Barbarian
Planet of the Apes
DC Universe
The Dark Knight
The Dark Knight Rises
Rumble Society
Gomez
Atticus Doom
Death Adder
Cuzin Eddie
PSCC (pink skulls chaos club)
Hoodz
Black Skulls Death Brigade
Black Skulls Death Brokers
Captain Nemo
Krig-13
Hawk P-40
Doc Nocturnal
White Skull: Agent
Baron Bends
Gold Skull Ninja
Mossquatch
Lord of Tears: Owl Man
Conan
Conan the Barbarian
Conan the Conqueror

 Past products 20,000 Leagues Under the SeaAlienAnimal HouseArmy of DarknessAustin PowersThe Blues BrothersCryptozoologyDark CarnivalDefenders of the DragonDick TracyEdward ScissorhandsGangsters Inc.The GoonHellboy (the movie)Hellboy ComicHellboy II: The Golden ArmyHeroesHoodzJack the RipperKongMiami ViceMonstersNFL: Extreme AthletesNotorious B.I.G.The OsbournesPiratesPopeyePredatorPublic EnemyReservoir DogsRoboCopScarfaceScary TalesSilent ScreamersTikiMonUnderworldThe WarriorsBreaking Bad''

See also
 Funko

References

External links
 
 Living Dead Dolls
 Mezco Action Figure Archive
 Mezco Collection Archive

Toy companies of the United States